Dampur is a village in Kamrup district of Assam, situated on the north bank of the Brahmaputra River. Dampur is a Big village in Assam, India. This village has 99% Muslim majority and Almost 25-35 mosque in this village. The people depend on agriculture and government jobs. Dampur is situated 25-30 km from Jalukbari, Guwahati. This village has 4-5 Islamic religious schools and one higher secondary school, 15 primary schools, one Fa. Saikia girls' high school, 5-6 private schools, one boys' school, and one madrasa high school.

Transportation
Dampur is connected to nearby towns through National Highway 31.

See also
Darkuchi

References

Villages in Kamrup district